David Kalmusky (born in Stratford, Ontario, Canada) is an American record producer, mixer, songwriter, and guitarist. He has worked with Shawn Mendes, Keith Urban, Meghan Trainor, Justin Bieber, Carrie Underwood, Mötley Crüe, John Legend, Tenille Townes, Mickey Guyton, Icon For Hire, and others.

Kalmusky is currently partner at Addiction Sound Studios, in Nashville TN, which he helped design and build with Chris Huston (Led Zeppelin, The Who) and Jonathan Cain (The Babys, Bad English, Journey). His private production and mixing room have been featured in publications such as Pro Sound News, Billboard Magazine, GrammyPro.com and several high end audio manufacturers such as Fab Filter, AVID, Miktek, Output Sounds, and Metric Halo.

References

American record producers
American session musicians
Canadian record producers
Canadian session musicians
People from Stratford, Ontario
Living people
Year of birth missing (living people)